American singer Mariah Carey has released 86 official singles, 22 promotional singles, and has made 30 guest appearances. Her self-titled debut album in 1990 yielded four number-one singles on the Billboard Hot 100, the first being "Vision of Love", a song credited with revolutionizing the usage of distinguished vocal stylings, predominantly the practice of melisma, and effectively influencing virtually every female R&B performer since the 1990s. Subsequent singles "Emotions" (1991) and Carey's cover of the Jackson 5 track, "I'll Be There" (1992) continued the singer's streak of US number-one singles, with the latter becoming her fourth chart-topper in Canada and first in the Netherlands. With the release of Carey's third studio album, Music Box (1993), the singer's international popularity surged upon release of "Hero" and the album's third single, her cover of Harry Nilsson's "Without You", which became the singer's first number-one single in several countries across Europe.

Carey's holiday album Merry Christmas (1994) produced the singer's perennial yule-tide classic "All I Want for Christmas Is You". With its continual expanding legacy, the song remains her highest seller and one of the best-selling singles of all time, with global sales of over 16 million copies. As of 2013, the song is estimated to have generated over $50 million in royalties. On December 21, 2019, a full quarter-century after its original release, "All I Want for Christmas Is You" topped the Hot 100 for the first time.

In 1995, the singer released her fifth studio effort, Daydream. Its singles "Fantasy" and "One Sweet Day" (with Boyz II Men) became Carey's ninth and tenth US number one singles, with the latter spending a record sixteen weeks atop the Billboard Hot 100. In following years, she released Butterflys (1997) "Honey" – which became Carey's third single to debut atop the US chart, and "When You Believe" (with Whitney Houston). The singer's version of "Against All Odds (Take a Look at Me Now)" (1999) (with Westlife) became her second chart-topping single in the UK.

Following a tumultuous period in the singer's personal life, her ensuing soundtrack and album, Glitter (2001) and Charmbracelet (2002) respectively, failed to gain significant commercial traction, and led to a series of unsuccessful singles. Largely considered her come-back album, Carey's tenth studio effort The Emancipation of Mimi (2005) revived faith in the singer's stock with its single "We Belong Together" becoming her strongest international showing in years, topping the chart in the US for 14 weeks, and breaking several radio airplay records. In 2010, "We Belong Together" was listed by Billboard as the most successful song of the decade. In 2008, "Touch My Body", the lead single from her album E=MC², became Carey's 18th chart-topper on the Hot 100, making her the solo artist with the most number ones in the charts history. 

Since Memoirs of an Imperfect Angel (2009), Carey has released a string of moderate to unsuccessful singles following into the release of her most recent offering, Caution (2018). In 2019, "All I Want For Christmas Is You" became Carey's 19th number-one song on the Hot 100, extending her record for the solo artist with the most number ones in the charts history. As of 2009, Carey has sold 17.2 million physical singles and 13.8 million digital tracks in the United States, according to Nielsen SoundScan. Based on 2023 RIAA database, Carey has more than 66 million certified singles in both, digital and physical categories combined. Throughout her career, the singer has spent a record 90 weeks at the number one position on the Hot 100, becoming the artist with the most weeks at number one in US history. Overall, she has 24 top-ten singles in the UK and 28 top-ten songs on the US chart, placing her in fifth place for the most top tens since its inception.

As lead artist

1990s

2000s

2010s

2020s

As featured artist

As part of a group

Promotional singles

Other charted songs

See also
List of best-selling singles
List of artists who reached number one in the United States
List of artists who reached number one on the U.S. dance chart
List of Billboard Hot 100 chart achievements and milestones
List of best-selling singles in Japan
List of artists who reached number one on the UK Singles Chart

Notes
Notes for songs

Notes for certifications and chart positions

References

Further reading

External links

Discographies of American artists
Pop music discographies
Rhythm and blues discographies
Soul music discographies